Biburg Abbey was a Benedictine monastery located at Biburg in Bavaria, Germany.

History
The monastery, dedicated to the Virgin Mary, was founded in 1132 by Konrad and Arbo von Sittling-Biburg, sons of the Blessed Berta of Biburg, who gave their castle to the Bishop of Bamberg for the purpose. The foundation was originally a double monastery for both men and women; the nunnery however burnt down in 1258 and was not re-built.

In 1555 the monastery was dissolved and the premises came into lay hands. In 1589 the Jesuit College of Ingolstadt obtained the buildings, which were taken over in 1781 by the Knights Hospitaller. In 1808 the monastery was secularised and passed into the possession of the Bavarian State.

See also
 List of Jesuit sites

References

Further reading
Adam Rottler Pfr. i. R.: Abensberg im Wandel der Zeiten, Abensberg 1972

External links

Monasteries in Bavaria
Benedictine monasteries in Germany
Society of Jesus
Knights Hospitaller
1130s establishments in the Holy Roman Empire
1132 establishments in Europe
1130s establishments in Germany
Religious organizations established in the 1130s
1808 disestablishments in Germany
Christian monasteries established in the 12th century